Gururaja Poojary (born 15 August 1992), also known as P. Gururaja, is an Indian weightlifter who won the silver medal in the men's 56 kg weight class at the 2018 Commonwealth Games and the bronze medal in 61 kg weight class at the 2022 Commonwealth Games.

References

External links
 
 

1992 births
Living people
Indian male weightlifters
Weightlifters from Karnataka
People from Udupi district
Commonwealth Games silver medallists for India
Commonwealth Games medallists in weightlifting
Weightlifters at the 2018 Commonwealth Games
Weightlifters at the 2022 Commonwealth Games
21st-century Indian people
Medallists at the 2018 Commonwealth Games
Medallists at the 2022 Commonwealth Games